Flora Sandes (22 January 1876 – 24 November 1956) was a British woman who served as a member of the Royal Serbian Army in World War I. She was the only British woman officially to serve as a soldier in that war. Initially a St. John Ambulance volunteer, she travelled to the Kingdom of Serbia, where she was welcomed and formally enrolled in the Serbian army. She was subsequently promoted to the rank of Sergeant major, and, after the war, to Captain. She was decorated with seven medals.

Biography

Early life
Flora Sandes was born on 22 January 1876 in Nether Poppleton, Yorkshire, the youngest daughter of an Irish family. Her father was Samuel Dickson Sandes (1822–1914), the former rector of Whitchurch, County Cork, and her mother was Sophia Julia (née Besnard). When she was nine years old, the family moved to Marlesford, Suffolk; and later to Thornton Heath, near Croydon, Surrey. As a child she was educated by governesses. She enjoyed riding and shooting and said that she wished she had been born a boy. She learned to drive, and drove an old French racing car. She took a job as a secretary. 

In her spare time, Sandes trained with the First Aid Nursing Yeomanry (FANY), founded in 1907 as an all-women mounted paramilitary organisation, learning first aid, horsemanship, signalling and drill. She left the FANY in 1910, joining another renegade, Mabel St Clair Stobart, in the formation of the Women's Sick and Wounded Convoy Corps. The Convoy saw service in Serbia and Bulgaria in 1912 during the First Balkan War. At the outbreak of the First World War in 1914, she volunteered to become a nurse, but was rejected due to a lack of qualifications.

Military career
Sandes nonetheless joined a St. John Ambulance unit raised by American nurse Mabel Grouitch, and on 12 August 1914 left England for Serbia with a group of 36 women to try to aid the humanitarian crises there. They arrived at the town of Kragujevac which was the base for the Serbian forces fighting against the Austro-Hungarian offensive. Sandes joined the Serbian Red Cross and worked in an ambulance for the Serbian Army's 2nd Infantry Regiment. In 1914 she went riding with a Serbian soldier who, impressed with her equestrian skills, told her she was wasted as a nurse and should enlist as a soldier; she told Dr Isabel Emslie, "I've always wished to be a soldier and to fight."

In 1915 Sandes struggled persistently to get to the front (despite the efforts of people such as the British Consul, who instructed her to return to safety), eventually joining the ambulance of the Second Regiment at the Babuna Pass. During the Great Retreat through Albania, all the other ambulance staff fled or were killed. Sandes could no longer make herself useful as a nurse and was enrolled as a private by General Miloš Vasić. She quickly advanced to the rank of Corporal. She recounted later that to formalize the change she removed her Red Cross badge and replaced it with the brass regimental figures from Colonel Milich's epaulettes. In 1916, during the Serbian advance on Bitola (Monastir), Sandes was seriously wounded by a grenade in hand to hand combat. She subsequently received the highest decoration of the Serbian Military, the Order of the Karađorđe's Star. At the same time, she was promoted to the rank of Sergeant major.

Also in 1916, Sandes published her autobiography, An English Woman-Sergeant in the Serbian Army, based on her letters and diaries. She used this account to help her raise funds for the Serbian Army, and was compared with the writings for Dr Caroline Matthews 'Experiences of a Woman Doctor in Serbia'. With Evelina Haverfield Sandes founded the Hon. Evelina Haverfield's and Sergt-Major Flora Sandes' Fund for Promoting Comforts for Serbian Soldiers and Prisoners. Unable to continue fighting due to her injury, she spent the remainder of the war running a hospital. In June 1919, a special Act of Parliament was passed in Serbia that made her the Serbian Army's first female commissioned officer. She was finally demobilised in October 1922.

Later life
In May 1927, Sandes married Yuri Yudenitch, a former Russian White Army general officer. The couple lived for a time in France, but afterwards returned to Serbia (which had become part of the Kingdom of Yugoslavia), and settled in Belgrade. Among other jobs, Sandes drove Belgrade's first taxicab. Also in 1927, she published a second autobiography. She lectured extensively on her wartime experiences in the United Kingdom, Australia, New Zealand, France, Canada and the United States. She wore her military uniform while delivering her lectures.

When during World War II Germany launched its attack on Yugoslavia in April 1941, Sandes and Yudenitch were recalled to military service, but the invasion was over before they could take up any military duties. They were briefly interned by the Germans, before being released on parole. Yudenitch fell ill, was removed to hospital, and died there in September 1941.

Sandes subsequently returned to England. She spent the last years of her life in Suffolk, living at Lower Hacheston near Wickham Market. She died at the East Suffolk and Ipswich Hospital on 24 November 1956: she was cremated at Ipswich Crematorium and her ashes scattered in the Garden of Remembrance. In St Andrew's Church in Marlesford a memorial plaque on the south wall in the choir stalls is dedicated to her.

Legacy

 In 1920, the sculptor Alice Meredith Williams made a painted plaster model of Flora Sandes in action for the Imperial War Museum, where it remains.
 In 2009 a street in Belgrade was named after her.
There was formerly a Wetherspoon pub named "The Flora Sandes" in her honour in Thornton Heath. It closed in 2018.

In popular culture 
Our Englishwoman, a television film based on the biography of Flora Sandes and directed by Slobodan Radovitch, was produced in 1997 by the Serbian broadcasting service RTS.
The last track of the album England Green and England Grey by Reg Meuross is "The Ballad of Flora Sandes". It is an interpretation of her life.

See also
Milunka Savić
Olive Kelso King
Ecaterina Teodoroiu
Maria Bochkareva
Leslie Joy Whitehead
Women in the military
Emancipation of women

Bibliography

Autobiographies

Other sources
 
 (This work is based on Sandes' two autobiographies and other historical sources, but also includes imaginative dialogue and passages.)

References

External links

 
 
Medical doctor and history, Documentary film - EAI

1876 births
1956 deaths
People from Suffolk Coastal (district)
People from Thornton Heath
English people of Irish descent
British women in World War I
Serbian military personnel of World War I
Women soldiers
Foreign volunteers in Serbian armies
Royal Serbian Army soldiers
Immigrants to the Kingdom of Serbia